Dr. Dikko Umar Radda (born 17 February 1979) is a Nigerian economist, politician and the former Director-General of the Small and Medium Enterprises Development Agency of Nigeria (SMEDAN). He was elected Governor of Katsina State  at the 2023 Nigeria governorship elections.

Early life and Education
He was born on 10 September 1969 in Hayin gada town, Dutsinma Local government area of Katsina state of Nigeria.

Education
He started his basic education at Radda Primary School from 1974 to 1980. He went to Zaria Teachers College between 1980 and 1985. And also he attended Kafanchan College of Education in 1986–1990, where he obtained his NCE certificate. Later attended Abubakar Tafawa Balewa University in Bauchi in 1992–1996, where he completed his B-Tech.Agric Economic and Extension (Hons) studies, then he got admission into Ahmadu Bello University Zaria in 1998- 2004 where he received MSC Agric Extension and Rural Sociology 2004. He returned to ABU Zaria in 2005 to obtain a master's degree in international affairs and diplomacy. He completed his PhD in Agriculture and Rural Sociology in 2015.

References 

Nigerian politicians
People from Katsina State
1970 births
Living people